"Shoe Box" is a song by Canadian band Barenaked Ladies, released as a single from their 1996 album, Born on a Pirate Ship. It is notable for being featured on the first soundtrack to the television series Friends, as well as the last track on the band's Born on a Pirate Ship album (added at the last minute). The song was also recorded and mixed for the band's live album, Rock Spectacle, but was ultimately left off, and later included on One Week single.

Music video

The video for the song was originally to feature Matt LeBlanc and Lisa Kudrow, from the sitcom Friends, but each pulled out nearly last minute, and had to be replaced with unknown actors. According to the commentary track on the DVD Barelaked Nadies, the male actor was Chris Hardwick, who later became famous for his work with Nerdist Industries. The video features a young girl who sneaks out of her bedroom to meet with an older man and go out with him for the night, only to be found by her mother and the police. At the end, the girl wakes up screaming, indicating that the scenario was only a dream. The performance portion of the video shows the band on a set with oversized props giving the appearance that they are within a shoe box kept under the girl's bed. The video is the first to feature new band member Kevin Hearn, who was not involved in the song's recording, but plays marimbas in the video nonetheless. The band later described the making of the video as a "fiasco".

EP
The Shoe Box EP is a four-track EP which also contains an "enhanced" portion. The disc contains both the original Pirate Ship album version of "Shoe Box", as well as the radio remix, which includes an 8-bar instrumental introduction. The EP also includes the B-side "Trust Me", which also later appeared on the "If I Had $1000000" single; the version on the EP includes a count-in at the beginning that is edited from the later single version. The final track is a version of "If I Had $1000000" from The Yellow Tape (which previously appeared on the UK Sandwich CD, which contains the first four tracks from The Yellow Tape in CD form).

The enhanced portion features video clips and other multimedia elements playable on a computer. However, the disc was created using the pregap format which has not been supported by Windows or Mac OS for some time, rendering the data inaccessible to most users.

Track listing

Personnel
 Steven Page – lead vocals, electric guitar
 Ed Robertson – electric guitar, background vocals
 Jim Creeggan – double bass, background vocals
 Tyler Stewart – drums, tambourine

Charts

Weekly charts

Year-end charts

Production
Producers: Michael Phillip Wojewoda, Barenaked Ladies on 3
Engineering: Michael Phillip Wojewoda, Walter Sobczak on 3
Photography/Design: Neil Prime-Coote
Publishing: Treat Baker Music, Warner Brothers Music Corp.

References

Barenaked Ladies songs
1995 singles
Barenaked Ladies EPs